The Dutiful Dub is a 1919 American short comedy film featuring Harold Lloyd.

Cast
 Harold Lloyd as The Boy
 Snub Pollard
 Bebe Daniels
 Harry Burns
 Billy Fay
 William Gillespie
 Lew Harvey
 Bud Jamison
 Margaret Joslin
 James Parrott
 Dorothea Wolbert

See also
 List of American films of 1919
 Harold Lloyd filmography

External links

1919 films
American silent short films
1919 comedy films
1919 short films
American black-and-white films
Films directed by Alfred J. Goulding
Silent American comedy films
American comedy short films
1910s American films